Dracula, in comics may refer to:

 Dracula (DC Comics), a DC Comics supervillain who has appeared in Superman comics, and is the main antagonist of the animated film The Batman vs. Dracula
 Dracula (Marvel Comics), a Marvel Comics supervillain
 Dracula (Dell Comics), a superhero published by Dell Comics
 Dracula (Buffy the Vampire Slayer), a character appearing in comic book adaptations of the TV series Buffy the Vampire Slayer
 Dracula, a character from the Boom! Studios series Dracula: The Company of Monsters
 Dracula, a villain in the Image Comics series Sword of Dracula
 Dracula, a character in Dynamite Entertainment's Ash vs. Dracula and The Magdalena vs. Dracula

See also
Dracula (disambiguation)